Folly North Site (38CH1213), also known as Little Folly Island, is a historic archaeological site located at Folly Beach, Charleston County, South Carolina.   The site contains the extant remains of two American Civil War artillery batteries constructed by the Union Army in 1863. Artifacts associated with eight other batteries and Fort Green have likely eroded into the Atlantic Ocean.  The batteries and fortifications were built as part of the Union effort to capture Charleston, South Carolina.

It was listed on the National Register of Historic Places in 2003.

References

Archaeological sites on the National Register of Historic Places in South Carolina
Buildings and structures in Charleston County, South Carolina
National Register of Historic Places in Charleston County, South Carolina
1863 establishments in South Carolina